The Canon EOS 700D, known as the Kiss X7i in Japan or as the Rebel T5i in the Americas, is an 18.0 megapixel digital single-lens reflex camera made by Canon. It was announced on March 21, 2013 with a suggested retail price of US$849. As a part of the Canon EOS three-digit/Rebel digital line, it is the successor to the EOS 650D/Kiss X6i/Rebel T4i and is the predecessor of both the EOS 750D/Kiss X8i/Rebel T6i and EOS 760D/EOS 8000D/Rebel T6s.

Features
The 700D has a feature set almost identical to that of the older 650D. According to photographer and technology writer Gordon Laing,It's fair to say that not a great deal has changed between the T5i / 700D and its predecessor. Indeed they're identical other than three changes: a new mode dial which can rotate through 360 degrees and keep turning, previews of Creative Filters in Live View, and a new external coating inherited from mid-range models like the 60D to provide a more durable finish.

The 700D, however, was introduced with a new kit lens — a new version of the existing EF-S 18–55mm that employs Canon's STM (stepping motor) technology. It also (for the first time in a Canon 18–55mm lens) has a front section that does not rotate.

Features include:
 18.0 effective megapixel APS-C CMOS sensor (Hybrid CMOS sensor)
 9 AF points, all cross-type at f/5.6. Center point is high precision, double cross-type at f/2.8 or faster
 DIGIC 5 image processor with 14-bit processing
 ISO 100 – 12800 sensitivity, extends to ISO 25600
 95% viewfinder frame coverage with 0.85x magnification
 1080p full HD video recording at 30fps, 25p (25 Hz) and 30p (29.97 Hz) with drop frame timing
 720p HD video recording at 60p (59.94 Hz) and 50p (50 Hz)
 480p ED video recording at 30p and 25p
 5.0 frames per second continuous shooting
 3.0-inch Vari-angle Clear View LCD II Touch screen with 1.04-megapixel resolution
 3.5 mm microphone jack for external microphones or recorders

Differences compared to EOS 650D:
 Real-time preview of Creative Filters in Live View mode
 Redesigned new mode dial that can rotate 360 degrees
 New "upmarket" textured body finish

References

External links

 Product page

700D
Live-preview digital cameras
Cameras introduced in 2013